André Verbeke (2 January 1908 – 9 March 1978) was a Belgian architect. In 1932 he won a bronze medal in the art competitions of the Olympic Games for his design of a "Marathon Park".

References

External links
 

1908 births
1978 deaths
20th-century Belgian architects
Olympic bronze medalists in art competitions
Medalists at the 1932 Summer Olympics
Olympic competitors in art competitions